Billon is an alloy of a precious metal (most commonly silver, but also gold) with a majority base metal content (such as copper). It is used chiefly for making coins, medals, and token coins.

The word comes from the French bille, which means "log".

History

The use of billon coins dates from ancient Greece and continued through the Middle Ages. During the sixth and fifth centuries BC, some cities on Lesbos used coins made of 60% copper and 40% silver. In both ancient times and the Middle Ages, leaner mixtures were adopted, with less than 2% silver content.

Billon coins are perhaps best known from the Roman Empire, where progressive debasements of the Roman denarius and the Roman provincial tetradrachm in the third century AD led to declining silver and increasing bronze content in these denominations of coins.  Eventually, by the third quarter of the third century AD, these coins were almost entirely bronze, with only a thin coating or even a wash of silver.

An example of a United States coin that is considered to be billon are the Jefferson nickels issued from 1942 through 1945. In order to save nickel and copper for the war effort, the composition of the nickel was changed to an alloy of 35% silver, 56% copper, and 9% manganese. These coins are easily identifiable by their color and by the presence of a large mintmark on top of the dome of Monticello.

See also
 Metal
 Bullion
 List of alloys
 Antoninianus
 Shakudō
 Coin

References

Precious metal alloys
Currency production
Silver
Numismatic terminology